The Rivière Rouge (in English: Red River) is a tributary of the west shore of Beaurivage River which is a tributary of the west bank of the Chaudière River (slope of the south bank of the St. Lawrence River). It flows in the municipalities of Saint-Agapit and Saint-Apollinaire in the Lotbinière Regional County Municipality, in the administrative region of Chaudière-Appalaches, in Quebec, in Canada.

Geography 
The main neighboring watersheds of the Red River are:
 north side: Aulneuse River, Beaurivage River, St. Lawrence River;
 east side: Beaurivage River, Chaudière River;
 south side: Noire River, rivière aux Pins, Henri River, Beaurivage River;
 west side: Henri River, Bourret brook, rivière aux Cèdres, Noire River.

The Red River has its source in the municipality of Saint-Agapit, on the boundary with the municipality of Saint-Apollinaire. This head area is located south of highway 20, southeast of the village center of Saint-Apollinaire and north-west of the village of Saint-Agapit.

From its source, the Red River flows over  divided into the following segments:
  eastward, to route 273;
  easterly, along the municipal boundary, to the municipal boundary of Saint-Apollinaire;
  towards the northeast, in Saint-Apollinaire, up to the limit of Lévis (sector "Saint-Étienne-de-Lauzon");
  northeasterly, up to its confluence.
The Red River empties on the west bank of the Beaurivage River north of the hamlet "Pointe-Saint-Gilles", in Lévis.

Toponymy 
The toponym "rivière Rouge" was made official on October 6, 1983, at the Commission de toponymie du Québec.

See also 

* List of rivers of Quebec

References 

Rivers of Chaudière-Appalaches
Lotbinière Regional County Municipality
Lévis, Quebec